Cub (also stylized cub) was an indie pop band from Vancouver, British Columbia that formed in 1992 and disbanded in 1997. They played a melodic, jangly form of pop punk they called "cuddlecore".

History

The group was emblematic of the twee pop and cuddlecore style. At their cozy, casual live shows, they sometimes played in their pajamas, and gave out presents to audience members.

The group's original drummer, Valeria Fellini, was replaced by Lisa G. in 1994.

Neko Case played drums on some early recordings and on tour in later years. Notably, she sang live in front of an audience for the first time ever during a cub show in Ohio, singing the song "So Far Apart". Years later she would go on to form her own all-female three piece Vancouver band, Maow.

After the group's dissolution, Robynn Iwata co-formed I Am Spoonbender in 1997 in San Francisco. Lisa Marr and Lisa G. started Buck in 1998 after moving to California from their native Vancouver.

Discography

Albums

Singles/EPs

 Pep (1992) Mint Records MRS-003. Produced by cub and Mecca Normal's Jean Smith. [6-song 7-inch EP, 5 compiled on Betti-Cola CD (one re-recorded)]
 Hot Dog Day (1993) Mint Records MRS-004 [6-song 7-inch EP, 5 compiled on Betti-Cola CD (one re-recorded)]
 Betti-Cola (1993) Mint Records MRS-005 [double 7-inch EP featuring 12 songs, 10 (and later 12) appearing on versions of Betti-Cola CD]
 "Your Bed"/"Cast A Shadow (live)," Volcano (1994) Mint Records MRS-009 [2-song single]
 Come Out Come Out (1995) Mint Records MRS-011 [13-song triple 7-inch EP, different song order from CD]
 The Day I Said Good-bye split with the Potatomen (1995) Co-release with Mint and Lookout! Records
 "Pillow Queen," The Pilot or FPAP(1995), Papercut records PCT-001 [split 7-inch EP w/ Raggedy Ann, Tullycraft, and Weakling.]
 TJ b/w She's Like A Rainbow (1996) SpinART

Appearances

 "Killed By Death" (Motorhead cover) on The Mint is Still a Terrible Thing to Taste, Mint Records (1993)
 "Flaming Red Bob Sled" on Periscope, Yoyo Recordings (1994)
 "Best Friend's Girl" (Cars cover) on 13 Soda Punx, Top Drawer Records (1994)
 ""I’ll Make It Up To You"" on  Drew Ramirez in: Air Disk King, Traumatone Records (1994)
 "Get Off The Road" (R. Lewis Band cover) on On Guard For Thee - A Collection of Canada's Youth Gone Bad, Au Go Go Records (1995)
 "Secret Nothing" on Ear of the Dragon, Fortune 5 (1995)
 "She's A Sensation" (Ramones cover) Nardwuar The Human Serviette Presents Skookum Chief Powered Teenage Zit Rawk Angst, Vol. I LP Nardwuar Records (1995)
 "Green Eyes" on A Slice of Lemon, Lookout!/Kill Rock Stars (1996)
 "Who The Hell Do You Think You Are?" A Tribute to Hard Core Logo (a companion release to the original soundtrack cd for the Bruce MacDonald mockumentary film which featured cover versions of the fictional band's songs) (1996)
 "Eyes Of A Stranger" (Payolas cover) on Fer Shure: A Tribute to the Valley Girl Soundtrack, Itchy Korean Records 1997

In popular culture
The song "Freaky" from the album Box of Hair was used in the first episode of Battlestar Galactica spinoff Caprica.
Their song "New York City" from the album Come Out Come Out was covered by They Might Be Giants on their album Factory Showroom.
The song "Little Star" from the album Betti-Cola was covered by Washington's Sicko on their album, Laugh While You Can Monkey Boy.
"Your Bed" was covered by the Redd Kross spin-off band Ze Malibu Kids and appeared on their debut (to date, only) record "Sound it Out."

Band members
 Robynn Iwata - vocals, guitar, artwork 
 Lisa Marr - vocals, bass 
 Lisa G. - vocals, drums 
 Valeria Fellini 
 Neko Case

References

External links
Mint Records page for cub including introduction from Lisa Marr.
cub on myspace

Musical groups established in 1992
Musical groups disestablished in 1997
Musical groups from Vancouver
Canadian indie pop groups
All-female bands
Mint Records artists
1992 establishments in British Columbia
1997 disestablishments in British Columbia
Cuddlecore musicians